The Green Line Rivalry, also known as the B-Line Rivalry, the Battle of Boston and Battle of Commonwealth Avenue, is the name for the sports rivalry between Boston College and Boston University. The rivalry is named after the Green Line, a light rail line that runs along Commonwealth Avenue and links the two schools as part of the MBTA, Boston's public transit system. The two campuses lie less than five miles apart.

The Green Line Rivalry is considered one of the top rivalries in college sports and first among college hockey rivalries. The Green Line Rivalry is the third most played college hockey rivalry series after the Michigan–Michigan State rivalry and the Battle for the Gold Pan.

Ice hockey

History
The series dates to February 6, 1918, when BU first began playing hockey, and played its lone game that year against BC, a 3–1 loss at the Boston Arena. Since then, no other opponent has appeared on either teams' schedule more often.  The rivalry has been renewed annually since the 1946–47 season, and the two teams have met at least twice a year since 1949.  The schools have met 275 times; BU leads the series 134–123–18.

With 18 NCAA championship game appearances between them, including a matchup in the 1978 championship game, Boston College and Boston University both field perennially competitive collegiate ice hockey teams. They compete in the Hockey East since 1984, having both previously been members of the ECAC since 1961.

The two teams meet thrice annually as part of their regular Hockey East season schedule, and often also meet in the Hockey East and NCAA postseason tournaments. Additionally, each first and second Monday in February, BC and BU, along with Harvard and Northeastern, take part in the annual Beanpot Tournament held at TD Garden, where the Eagles and Terriers often square off in the championship game. In the 70 years of the tournament, the two teams have played for the Beanpot trophy 22 times, with BU winning 12 of the championship matchups and BC winning 10. Both teams have had stretches where they dominated the tournament, however, the Terriers have triumphed more often, winning the title 31 times compared to the Eagles' 20 titles (Harvard and Northeastern combined have only won 19 times).  The Eagles defeated the Terriers 1–0 in overtime of the 2016 Beanpot championship.

Both teams have won the national championship five times; BC in 1949, 2001, 2008, 2010, 2012 and BU in 1971, 1972, 1978, 1995, 2009.  The two rivals faced off in the 1978 championship game in Providence, with BU claiming its third national championship with a 5–3 victory in Providence, RI.  BU and BC have met in NCAA tournament play on one other occasion in the 2006 NCAA Men's Division I Ice Hockey Tournament Northeast Regional Final, with the Eagles skating to a 5–0 victory over the top-seeded Terriers.

The rivalry is highlighted by its intensity and mutual contempt between both players and fans. For instance, after BU's victory over BC in the 1978 national championship, BU co-captain Jack O'Callahan was quoted as saying "We shouldn't have to beat BC for the nationals. Hell, we can do that anytime."  In a 2005 Sports Illustrated article, BC senior captain Ryan Shannon said that "Every once in a while, out in a restaurant, you see familiar faces. But hockey culture is so humble. Outside the rink, you see those guys as human beings," but when the on the rink: "They're evil. They're a Terrier." Games feature an array of chants and insults chanted by each schools' students sections, the BC Superfans and BU Dog Pound.

The rivalry was amplified when on January 8, 2010, BC and BU faced off at Fenway Park, the first men's college hockey game to be played at Boston's iconic ballpark. BU edged BC 3–2 in front of a crowd of 38,000, the largest crowd to ever watch the two schools play.

A documentary about the rivalry entitled The Battle of Comm Ave. was released in 2009 by Rival Films. The documentary contains game footage and interviews with numerous players and coaches.

On November 8, 2013, the teams faced off in the first non York–Parker matchup since 1994. The Eagles defeated the David Quinn-led Terriers 5–1 at Agganis Arena. Parker retired in the 2012–13 offseason after 40 years of coaching the Terriers. 

During the 2020-21 season, Agganis Arena was unavailable for play, as it was being used for state COVID-19 pandemic purposes. Thus on February 6, 2021, Walter Brown Arena served as host for a matchup for the first time since January 17, 2004, where the Terries skated to a 3–1 win over #1-ranked Boston College.

On December 9, 2022, the Eagles and Terriers met in the first matchup since 1972 that did not include at least one of Jerry York or Jack Parker as head coach of their respective team. York retired in the 2022–23 offseason after 50 years of coaching. BC, led by Greg Brown defeated BU by a score of 9–6 at Conte Forum.

Game results

Football
"The Green Line Rivalry" originally referred to the football rivalry between the schools, a series begun in 1893 and played annually from 1928 to 1942 and 1954 to 1962. In the 1954 to 1962 run of games both teams competed for the Sacred Cod Trophy in a round-robin series with Holy Cross. With BC leading the series 27–4–1, BU discontinued the rivalry after the 1962 season; a game was scheduled to be played at Fenway Park in 1963 but was scrapped due to the John F. Kennedy assassination and no further games were scheduled in the years that followed. BU eventually terminated its football program in 1997.

The club football team at Boston University expressed interest in renewing the football Green Line Rivalry with Boston College, possibly with a junior varsity team, in the 2015 season; it did not materialize.

Game results

Men's soccer 
The rivalry is predominate in men's soccer as well. In 2007, CollegeSoccerNews.com named the rivalry one of the 14 best men's college soccer rivalries in the country. Boston College leads the series 25-12-7.

Game results

Other sports
The Green Line Rivalry has also come to refer to the rivalry between BC and BU in other sports.  In soccer, the two schools regularly open the season against each other with the expectation of large freshman-filled crowds.

See also  
 List of NCAA college football rivalry games
 College rivalries

References

Boston College Eagles
Boston University Terriers
College sports rivalries in the United States
College ice hockey rivalries in the United States
College basketball rivalries in the United States
College football rivalries in the United States
College soccer rivalries in the United States
1893 establishments in Massachusetts